Symboli Rudolf (Japanese : シンボリルドルフ, March 13, 1981 - October 4, 2011) was a Japanese thoroughbred racehorse who won the Japanese Triple Crown, sired by Partholon, a son of Milesian, out of Sweet Luna, a daughter of Speed Symboli. Symboli Rudolf was inducted into the Japan Racing Association Hall of Fame in 1987.

Racing career 

 Major Racing Wins
 1984 Yayoi Sho (Domestic GIII), Nakayama Turf 2000m
 1984 Satsuki Sho (Japanese 2000 Guineas) (Domestic GI), Nakayama Turf 2000m
 1984 Tokyo Yushun (Japanese Derby) (Domestic GI), Tokyo Turf 2400m
 1984 St Lite Kinen (Domestic GII), Nakayama Turf 2200m
 1984 Kikuka Sho (Japanese St. Leger) (Domestic GI), Kyoto Turf 3000m
 1984 Arima Kinen (Grand Prix) (Domestic GI), Nakayama Turf 2500m
 1985 Nikkei Sho (Domestic GII), Nakayama Turf 2500m
 1985 Tenno Sho (spring) (Domestic GI), Kyoto Turf 3200m
 1985 Japan Cup (Domestic GI), Tokyo Turf 2400m
 1985 Arima Kinen (Grand Prix) (Domestic GI), Nakayama Turf 2500m

He is the first undefeated Triple Crown (not losing a single race until winning Kikuka Sho, later succeeded by Deep Impact in 2005 and Contrail in 2020) as well as the first Triple Crown winner since the introduction of Racing Grades in Japan.

Progeny 
 Tokai Teio (1988), winner of Satsuki Sho (Japanese 2000 Guineas) (Domestic GI) (1991), Tokyo Yushun (Japanese Derby) (Domestic GI) (1991), Japan Cup (GI) (1992) and Arima Kinen (Grand Prix) (Domestic GI) (1993).
 Ayrton Symboli (1989) winner of the 1992 and 1993 Stayers Stakes (Domestic GIII)
 Tsurumaru Tsuyoshi (1995), winner of the 1999 Asahi Challenge Cup (Domestic GIII) and Kyoto Daishoten (Domestic GII)

Pedigree

See also 
 List of historical horses
 St Lite (Japanese first Triple crown in 1941)
 Shinzan (Japanese Triple crown in 1964)
 Mr. C.B. (Japanese Triple crown in 1983)
 Narita Brian (Japanese Triple crown in 1994)
 Deep Impact (Japanese Triple crown in 2005)
 Orfevre (Japanese Triple crown in 2011)

1981 racehorse births
2011 racehorse deaths
Racehorses bred in Japan
Racehorses trained in Japan
Triple Crown of Thoroughbred Racing winners
Japan Cup winners
Japanese Thoroughbred Horse of the Year
Thoroughbred family 11-c
Byerley Turk sire line